KSRT (107.1 FM) is a commercial radio station broadcasting a Regional Mexican radio format. Licensed to Cloverdale, California, United States, it serves the Santa Rosa area.  The station is currently owned by Lazer Licenses, LLC.

External links

Mass media in Sonoma County, California
SRT
SRT